Clere Parsons (1908 - 1931) was an English poet, born in India.
He was educated at Christ Church, University of Oxford, and edited the 1928 edition of Oxford Poetry.

His only collection, Poems, was published after his death by Faber & Faber. Both the Oxford University Press Anthology of Twentieth-Century British and Irish Poetry, and Penguin Books Poetry of the Thirties include selections from his work.

His work was influenced by that of W. H. Auden and Laura Riding, and has been praised by Geoffrey Grigson and C. H. Sisson.

Parsons had Type I diabetes, and died of pneumonia.

References

1908 births
1931 deaths
Alumni of Christ Church, Oxford
Deaths from pneumonia
People with type 1 diabetes
20th-century English poets
English male poets
20th-century English male writers
British people in colonial India